B-Boy Records was an American independent hip hop record label formed by Jack Allen and William Kamarra in 1986, and situated at 132nd Street and Cypress Avenue in the Bronx, New York City. Its most notable signing was Boogie Down Productions, and it released Boogie Down Productions' first singles, "South Bronx" (1986) and "The Bridge is Over" (1987), and the group's landmark debut album, Criminal Minded (1987). Other acts that recorded for the label included JVC Force, Cold Crush Brothers, Levi 167 and Jewel T.

The label's output was a mix of new names and old pioneers, and documents a period in which self-assertive lyrics begin to detail street life even as the music moved from hardcore drum-machine-based tracks to the horns and drum sounds of sampler-based hip hop. B-Boy Records folded in 1988, though Nate Patrin of Pitchfork Media reports that, "both Allen and Kamarra have set about reviving the B-Boy Records name independently of each other, and there seems to have been a number of bridges burned between the two men."

Foundation
B-Boy Records was founded by Jack Allen and William Kamarra in 1986, with one act on its roster. Allen, Kamarra, and Ray Wilson, calling themselves Rock Candy Records and Filmworks, advertised that a record label was seeking new musical talent in a newspaper. (Steve Huey of AllMusic reported rumors that it was seeking to establish a front for a pornography business.) The ad was answered by the then-unrecorded Boogie Down Productions, now the most famous of the acts that were to be associated with the label. By request, the group recorded an anti-drug song called "Crack Attack" and was signed to the newly formed B-Boy Records. The label's graffiti-style logo was designed by the group's lead emcee, KRS-One.

Notable releases
The first official B-Boy release was Boogie Down Productions' "South Bronx" (1986). A forcefully delivered oral history of hip hop written in response to MC Shan's "The Bridge." It generated considerable New York interest and became part of hip hop history (see the Bridge Wars). Technically homeless, KRS-One was living in a meat freezer below the B-Boy Records offices during this period. "South Bronx" was characteristic of much of B-Boy's releases: noisy, minimalist hip hop driven by the drum machine rather than the sampler. The Brothers' "I Got Rhythm", Wax Master Torey's "Duck Season", Jewel T's "I Like It Loud" and Levi 167's "Something Fresh to Swing To" (all 1987) are further examples. By contrast, the same year's "Just Saying Fresh Rhymes" by Castle D relies on a relatively quiet percussive accompaniment based around the hi-hat, and a disorienting synth melody reminiscent today of G-funk. Other notable, but more sampler-influenced, 1987 releases include The Busy Boys' "Classical," "Feel The Horns" by old school pioneers Cold Crush Brothers, and Sparky D's "Throwdown."

After its first album, the landmark Criminal Minded (1987), Boogie Down Productions was supposed to sign with Warner Bros. Records and the label folded soon afterward. According to writer Peter Shapiro, B-Boy's best release besides those by Boogie Down was Levi 167's aforementioned 1987 single. They did however have late success with "Strong Island" (1988) by JVC Force, which Shapiro calls "one of the most kinetic records in hip-hop history". After the murder of Scott La Rock, however, BDP ultimately signed with Jive Records.

B-Boy Records’ discography is now controlled Traffic Entertainment Group, under exclusive license from Phase One Network Inc.

Retrospectives
A 2002 retrospective of the label, The Best of B-Boy Records, is available on Landspeed Records (not to be confused with Boogie Down Productions' 2001 compilation, Best of B-Boy Records, on the same label). In 2007 the two-disc B-Boy Records: The Archives Rare & Unreleased was released through Traffic Entertainment Group, the successor of LandSpeed. In 2008, again through Traffic, came a four-disc MP3 collection of the label's complete official output, B-Boy Records: The Masterworks, featuring short-lived  B-Boy Records acts such as Soul Dimension, Incredible Two, Crazy 8 Posse and Wacky Rapper, as well as a late release from Spyder-D (of "Big Apple Rappin'" fame), and B Girls Live and Kicking (1987), a collection of B-Boy's female MCs (Sparky D, Five Star Moet, Baby Doll, and L.A. Star). Not on the release was that the group BDP was to produce "Gotta-Rock" (G-Supreme & K-Rakeem), but Scott La Rock was killed before any work was done.

Nate Patrin, writing for Pitchfork, observes that in B-Boy's recordings, "you can divine the beginnings of independent, street-level hardcore rap lyricism during the key transitional point that shifted the dominant production style from the 808 drum machine to the SP1200 sampler." He describes the label's roster as "a dizzying array of past icons, future legends, coulda-beens, never-weres and more than a few acts you probably haven't heard of that caught lightning in a bottle for one 12" record".

See also

 Music of New York City

References

Bibliography

American record labels
Record labels established in 1986
Hip hop record labels
1987 establishments in New York City
Underground hip hop